Dehnow-e Moqimi (also Romanized as Dehnow-e Moqīmī; also known as Deh-i-Nau, Dehnow, and Deh Now-e Pā’īn) is a village in Rostam-e Do Rural District, in the Central District of Rostam County, Fars Province, Iran. At the 2006 census, its population was 906, in 156 families.

References 

Populated places in Rostam County